Steven Berkoff (born Leslie Steven Berks; 3 August 1937) is an English actor, author, playwright, theatre practitioner and theatre director. 

As a theatre maker he is recognised for staging work with a heightened performance style eponymously known as "Berkovian theatre", which combines elements of physical theatre, total theatre and expressionism. His work has sometimes been viewed as an example of in-yer-face theatre, due to the intense presentation and taboo-breaking material in a number of his plays.           

As a film actor, he is known for his performances in villainous roles, including the portrayals of General Orlov in the James Bond film Octopussy (1983), Victor Maitland in Beverly Hills Cop (1984), Lt. Col. Podovsky in Rambo: First Blood Part II (1985) and Adolf Hitler in the TV mini-series War and Remembrance (1988–89).

Early life
Berkoff was born Leslie Steven Berks on 3 August 1937, in Stepney in the East End of London, the son of Pauline "Polly" (née Hyman), a housewife, and Alfred "Al" Berks, a tailor. He had an older sister, Beryl (1930-before 2010). He comes from a Jewish family; his grandparents emigrated to England in the 1890s, his paternal grandparents from Romania, and his maternal grandparents from Russia. The family name was originally Berkowitz, but Steven's father anglicised it to Berks in order to aid the family's assimilation into British society. Steven (who had been known as Leslie growing up) later legally changed his surname to Berkoff and went by his middle name.

During World War II, Berkoff, his sister and their mother were evacuated to Luton, Bedfordshire in 1942. In 1947 he and his family emigrated to the United States, sailing from Southampton aboard the Queen Elizabeth to live with relatives of Berkoff's mother in Nyack, New York. However, Berkoff's father struggled to find work, and after a few months the family returned to England. Berkoff attended Raine's Foundation Grammar School (1948–50) and Hackney Downs School (1950-1955). 

In 1952, he was arrested for stealing a bicycle and was sentenced to three months in borstal. He took drama courses at City Literary Institute (1957–58), trained as an actor at the Webber Douglas Academy of Dramatic Art (1958–59), and later trained in physical theatre and mime at L'École Internationale de Théâtre Jacques Lecoq, graduating in 1965.

Career

Theatre
Berkoff started his theatre training in the Repertory Company at Her Majesty's Theatre in Barrow-in-Furness, for approximately two months, in June and July 1962.

As well as an actor, Berkoff is a noted playwright and theatre director. His earliest plays are adaptations of works by Franz Kafka: The Metamorphosis (1969); In the Penal Colony (1969), and The Trial (1971). In the 1970s and 1980s, he wrote a series of verse plays including East (1975), Greek (1980), and Decadence (1981), followed by West (1983) (later adapted and recorded at Limehouse Studios for transmission on Channel 4 in 1983), Harry's Christmas (Lunch) (also recorded at Limehouse Studios in 1983 but was never transmitted by C4 as it was considered "too dark"), Sink the Belgrano! (1986), Massage (1997), and The Secret Love Life of Ophelia (2001). Berkoff described Sink the Belgrano! as "even by my modest standards... one of the best things I have done".

Drama critic Aleks Sierz describes Berkoff's dramatic style as "In-yer-face theatre":

In 1988, Berkoff directed an interpretation of Salome by Oscar Wilde, performed in slow motion, at the Gate Theatre, Dublin. For his first directorial job at the UK's Royal National Theatre, Berkoff revived the play with a new cast at the Lyttelton Auditorium; it opened in November 1989. In 1998, his solo play Shakespeare's Villains premièred at London's Haymarket Theatre and was nominated for a Society of London Theatre Laurence Olivier Award for Best Entertainment.

In a 2010 interview with guest presenter Emily Maitlis on The Andrew Marr Show, Berkoff stated that he found it "flattering" to play evil characters, saying that the best actors assumed villainous roles. In 2011, Berkoff revived a previously performed one-man show at the Hammersmith Riverside Studios, titled One Man. It consisted of two monologues; the first was an adaptation of Edgar Allan Poe's short story The Tell-Tale Heart, the second a piece called Dog, written by Berkoff, which was a comedy about a loud-mouthed football fan and his dog. In 2013, Berkoff performed his play An Actor's Lament at the Sinden Theatre in Tenterden, Kent; it is his first verse play since Decadence in 1981. His 2018 one-act play Harvey deals with the story of Harvey Weinstein.

Film
In film, Berkoff has played villains such as Soviet General Orlov in the James Bond film Octopussy (1983), the corrupt art dealer Victor Maitland in Beverly Hills Cop (1984), the Soviet officer Colonel Podovsky in Rambo: First Blood Part II (1985), and gangster George Cornell in The Krays (1990). Berkoff has stated that he accepts roles in Hollywood only to subsidise his theatre work, and that he regards many of the films in which he has appeared as lacking artistic merit.

In the Stanley Kubrick films A Clockwork Orange (1971) and Barry Lyndon (1975), Berkoff played, respectively, a police officer and a gambler aristocrat. His other films include the Hammer film Prehistoric Women (1967), Nicholas and Alexandra (1971), The Passenger (1975), Joseph Andrews (1977), McVicar (1980), Outland (1981), Coming Out of the Ice (1982), Underworld (1985), Revolution (1985), Absolute Beginners (1986), Prince's film Under the Cherry Moon (1986), Prisoner of Rio (1988), the Australian film Flynn (1993), Fair Game (1995), and Legionnaire (1998).

Berkoff was the main character voice in Expelling the Demon (1999), a short animation with music by Nick Cave. It received the award for Best Debut at the KROK International Animated Films Festival. He has a cameo in the 2008 film The Cottage. Berkoff appeared in the 2010 British gangster film The Big I Am as "The MC", and in the same year, portrayed the antagonist in The Tourist. Berkoff portrayed Dirch Frode, attorney to Henrik Vanger (Christopher Plummer), in David Fincher's 2011 adaptation of The Girl with the Dragon Tattoo. Another 2011 credit is the independent film Moving Target. He also stars in Decline of an Empire (2014) playing the role of Liberius.

In 1994, he both appeared in and directed the film version of his verse play Decadence. Filmed in Luxembourg, it co-stars Joan Collins.

Television
In television, Berkoff had early roles in episodes of The Avengers and UFO episodes "The Cat with Ten Lives" and “Destruction’ in 1970. Other TV credits include: Hagath, in the episode "Business as Usual" of Star Trek: Deep Space Nine; Stilgar, in the mini-series Children of Dune; gangster Mr. Wiltshire in one episode of Hotel Babylon; Dr. Paul Jorry in the episode "Deadline" of Space Precinct; lawyer Freddie Eccles in "By the Pricking of My Thumbs", an episode of Agatha Christie's Marple; and Adolf Hitler in the mini-series War and Remembrance. In 1998, he made a guest appearance in the Canadian TV series La Femme Nikita (in the episode "In Between"). In 2006, he played celebrity/criminal Ray Cook in the New Tricks episode "Bank Robbery".

In 2010, Berkoff played former Granada Television chairman Sidney Bernstein for the BBC Four drama, The Road to Coronation Street. He has played the historical Florentine preacher Girolamo Savonarola in two separate TV productions: the 1990 TV film A Season of Giants and the 2011 series The Borgias. Berkoff appears as himself in the "Science" episode of the British current affairs satire Brass Eye (1997), warning against the dangers of the fictional environmental disaster "Heavy Electricity". In September 2012, Berkoff appeared in the Doctor Who episode "The Power of Three".

In 2014, Berkoff played a supporting role in the second season of the Lifetime TV show Witches of East End as King Nikolaus, the patriarch of the Beauchamp family.

In 2016, he appeared in series 3, episode 1 of the Channel 4 sitcom Man Down as Mr. Klackov, a "terrifying" caretaker with an Eastern European accent "who makes covering [series protagonist] Dan's mistakes even more complicated" when his job as a schoolteacher is threatened.

Other work
In 1996, Berkoff appeared as the Master of Ceremonies in a BBC Radio 2 concert version of Kander and Ebb's Cabaret. He provided the voice-over for the N-Trance single "The Mind of the Machine", which rose to No. 15 in the UK Singles Chart in August 1997. He appeared in the opening sequence to Sky Sports' coverage of the 2007 Heineken Cup Final, modelled on a speech by Al Pacino in the film Any Given Sunday (1999).

Berkoff voices the character General Lente, commander of the Helghan Third Army, in Killzone. He provides motion capture and voice performance for the PlayStation 3 game Heavenly Sword, as General Flying Fox.

Berkoff's 2015 novel Sod the Bitches has been described as "a kind of Philip Roth-like romp through the sex life of a libidinous actor". His 2014 memoir Bad Guy! Journal of a Hollywood Turkey records his time working on a Hollywood blockbuster.

Berkoff appeared in the British Heart Foundation's two-minute public service advertisement, Watch Your Own Heart Attack, broadcast on ITV in August 2008. He also presented two episodes of the BBC Two Horizon episodes: "To Infinity and Beyond..." (2010) and "The Power of the Placebo" (2014).

He is a patron of Brighton's Nightingale Theatre, a fringe theatre venue.

Critical assessment
According to Annette Pankratz in her 2005 Modern Drama review of Steven Berkoff and the Theatre of Self-Performance by Robert Cross: "Steven Berkoff is one of the major minor contemporary dramatists in Britain anddue to his self-fashioning as a bad boy of British theatre and the ensuing attention of the media – a phenomenon in his own right." Pankratz further asserts that Cross "focuses on Berkoff's theatre of self-performance: that is, the intersections between Berkoff, the public phenomenon and Berkoff, the artist."

Personal life
Berkoff married Alison Minto in 1970, and Shelley Lee in 1976; both marriages ended in divorce. He lives with his wife Clara Fischer, a German pianist, in Limehouse, east London. Fischer appeared onscreen with Berkoff in his film Decadence. He has two daughters, Mylea and Sarah, from previous relationships.

Defamation lawsuit
In 1996, Berkoff won Berkoff vs. Burchill, a libel civil action that he brought against Sunday Times journalist Julie Burchill after she published comments suggesting that he was "hideously ugly". The judge ruled for Berkoff, finding that Burchill's actions "held him to ridicule and contempt."

Political and religious views
Berkoff has spoken and written about how he believes Jews and Israel to be regarded in Britain. In a January 2009 interview with The Jewish Chronicle, in which he discussed anti-Israel sentiment in the aftermath of the Gaza War, he said: Interviewer Simon Round noted that Berkoff was also keen to express his view that right-wing Israeli politicians, such as Ariel Sharon and Benjamin Netanyahu, were "wretched". Asked if British antisemitism manifested itself in theatre, Berkoff responded: "They quite like diversity and will tolerate you as long as you act a bit Gentile and don't throw your chicken soup around too much. You are perfectly entitled occasionally even to touch the great prophet of British culture, Shakespeare, as long as you keep your Jewishness well zipped up." Berkoff also referred to the Gaza war as a factor in writing Biblical Tales: "It was the recent 'Gaza' war and the appalling flack that Israel received that prompted me to investigate ancient Jewish values."

Speaking to The Jewish Chronicle in May 2010, Berkoff criticised the Bible but added, "it inspires the Jews to produce Samsons and heroes and to have pride". Berkoff went on to say of the Talmud in the same article: "As Jews, we are so incredibly lucky to have the Talmud, to have a way of re-interpreting the Torah. So we no longer cut off hands, and slay animals, and stone women."

In a Daily Telegraph travel article written while visiting Israel in 2007, Berkoff described Melanie Phillips' book Londonistan: How Britain Is Creating a Terror State Within, as "quite overwhelming in its research and common sense. It grips me throughout the journey."

In 2012, Berkoff, with others, wrote in support of Israel's national theatre, Habima, performing in London.

References in popular culture
In the 1989 romantic comedy The Tall Guy, struggling actor Dexter King (Jeff Goldblum) auditions unsuccessfully for an imaginary "Berkoff play" called England, My England. In the audition, characters dressed as skinheads swear repetitively at each other and a folding table is kicked over. Afterwards, Dexter's agent Mary (Anna Massey) muses, "I think he's probably mad ..."

"I'm scared of Steven Berkoff" is a line in the lyrics of the song "I'm Scared" by Queen guitarist Brian May, issued on his 1993 debut solo album Back to the Light. May has declared himself to be an admirer of Berkoff and his wife, Anita Dobson, has appeared in several of Berkoff's plays.

Filmography

Film
{| class="wikitable sortable"
|-
! Year !! Title !! Role !! Notes
|-
|1958 || I Was Monty's Double || Minor role || uncredited
|-
|1958 || The Sheriff of Fractured Jaw ||Teenage boy || uncredited
|-
|1959 || The Captain's Table || Minor role || uncredited
|-
|1959 || The Devil's Disciple || British corporal || uncredited
|-
|1960 || The Flesh and the Fiends || Medical student || uncredited
|-
|1961 || Konga || Student on field trip || uncredited
|-
|1967 || Prehistoric Women || John ||
|-
|1969 || Vendetta for the Saint || Bertoli ||
|-
|1971 || Nicholas and Alexandra || Pankratov ||
|-
|1971 || A Clockwork Orange || Det. Const. Tom ||
|-
|1975 || The Passenger || Stephen ||
|-
|1975 || Barry Lyndon || Lord Ludd ||
|-
|1977 || Joseph Andrews || Greasy Fellow ||
|-
|1980 || McVicar || Ronnie Harrison ||
|-
|1981 || Outland || Sagan ||
|-
|1982 || Coming Out of the Ice || Atoman ||
|-
|1983 || Octopussy || General Orlov ||
|-
|1984 || Beverly Hills Cop || Victor Maitland ||
|-
|1985 || Rambo: First Blood Part II || Lieutenant Colonel Sergei Podovsky ||
|-
|1985 || Underworld || Hugo Motherskille ||
|-
|1985 || Revolution || Sgt. Jones ||
|-
|1986 || Absolute Beginners || The Fanatic ||
|-
|1986 || Under the Cherry Moon || Mr. Sharon ||
|-
|1988 || Prisoner of Rio || Jack McFarland || 
|-
|1990 || The Krays || George Cornell ||
|-
|1993 || Flynn || Klaus Reicher ||
|-
|1994 || Decadence || Steve / Les / Helen's Couturier ||
|-
|1995 || Fair Game || Colonel Ilya Pavel Kazak ||
|-
|1997 || Love in Paris || Vittorio DaSilva ||
|-
|1998 || Legionnaire || Sgt. Steinkampf ||
|-
|2000 || Rancid Aluminium || Mr. Kant ||
|-
|2001 || Beginner's Luck || Magic Bob ||
|-
| rowspan="3" |2002 || Steal || Surtayne ||
|-
| 9 Dead Gay Guys || Jeff ||
|-
| Bokshu, the Myth || Professor Metcalf || 
|-
|2003 || Headrush || The Uncle ||
|-
| rowspan="4" |2004 || Action Man: Robot Atak || Dr. X || Voice
|-
| Charlie || Charlie Richardson Snr. ||
|-
| Head in the Clouds || Charles Bessé ||
|-
| Brides || Karabulat ||
|-
| rowspan="2" |2005 || The Headsman || Inquisitor ||
|-
| Forest of the Gods || Commandant Hoppe ||
|-
| rowspan="2" |2006 || The Flying Scotsman || Ernst Hagemann ||
|-
| Pu-239 || Starkov ||
|-
| rowspan="2" |2007 || Say It in Russian || Oleg Rozhin ||
|-
| Medvezhya okhota || ||
|-
|2008 || The Cottage || Arnie ||
|-
| rowspan="2" |2009 || At World's End || Jack Pudovski ||
|-
| 44 Inch Chest || Tippi Gordon ||
|-
| rowspan="6" |2010 || Perfect Life || The Elder ||
|-
| The Big I Am || The MC ||
|-
| Just for the Record || Mike Rosferry ||
|-
| Dead Cert || Kenneth Mason ||
|-
| The Tourist || Reginald Shaw ||
|-
| The Rapture || The Controller ||
|-
| rowspan="3" |2011 || Moving Target || Lawrence Masters ||
|-
| Big Fat Gypsy Gangster || Guru Shah ||
|-
| The Girl with the Dragon Tattoo || Dirch Frode ||
|-
|2012 || Strippers vs Werewolves || Flett ||
|-
|2013 || Red 2 || Cobb ||
|-
| rowspan="2" |2014 || Fall of an Empire || Liberius ||
|-
| We Still Kill the Old Way || Charlie Archer ||
|- 
| rowspan="4" |2015 || North v South || Vic Clarke ||
|-
| Remembering Nigel || Steven Berkoff || Cameo
|-
| 7 Cases || Lawson ||
|-
| Rise of the Footsoldier Part II: Reign of the General || Dr. Flint ||
|-
| rowspan="2" |2016 || Manhattan Night || Sebastian Hobbs ||
|-
| Titanium White || Father Tornatore ||
|-
| rowspan="5" |2017 || Riot || Chief Constable ||
|-
| Transhuman || Til ||
|-
| London Heist || Alfie ||
|-
| Fanged Up || Governor Payne ||
|-
| The Dot Man || General West ||
|-
|2018 || Point of No Return || Evans ||
|-
| rowspan="3" |2019 || Tell Tale Heart || Edmund ||
|-
| Red Devil || Lazarus ||
|-
| The Last Faust || Dr. Goodfellow ||
|-
|2020 || Righteous Villains || Grandfather ||
|-
| rowspan="2" |2021 || Creation Stories || Alistair Crowley ||
|-
| Alice, Through the Looking || The Executive Producer ||
|-
| rowspan="2" |2022 || Exorcist Vengeance || Bishop Canelo || 
|-
| Prizefighter: The Life of Jem Belcher || Walter ||
|}

Television

Works as author (incomplete)Plays In the Penal Colony (1968) - adaptation of the Franz Kafka short story of the same name. 
 Metamorphosis (1969) - adaptation of the Franz Kafka novella of the same name. 
 The Trial (1970) - adaptation of the Franz Kafka novel of the same name. 
 Agamemnon (1973) - adaptation of Aeschylus's play of the same name.
 Miss Julie versus Expressionism - adaptation of August Strindberg's play Miss Julie.
 Fall of the House of Usher (1974) - adaptation of the Edgar Allan Poe short story of the same name.
 East (1975)
 Greek (1980) - originally written in 1979. Inspired by Oedipus Rex by Sophocles.
 Decadence (1981)
 The Tell-Tale Heart (1981) - adapted from the Edgar Allan Poe short story of the same name.
 West (1983) - originally written in 1978 as a TV play which was later filmed in 1984. Inspired by Beowulf. A companion piece to East.  
 Lunch (1983) - originally written in 1966. 
 Actor (1985)
 Harry's Christmas (1985)
 Kvetch (1986)
 Sink the Belgrano! (1986) - inspired by the sinking of the ARA General Belgrano.
 Acapulco (1990) - inspired by Berkoff's experience off-set on the film Rambo: First Blood Part II.
 Brighton Beach Scumbags (1991)
 Pitbull later renamed to Dog (1993)
 Massage (1997)
 Shakespeare's Villains (1998) - inspired by and exploring the villains in the plays of William Shakespeare.
 The Bow of Ulysses (2001) - sequel to Lunch.
 Dahling You Were Marvellous (2001) - originally an unproduced television play written in 1989. 
 Sturm und Drang 
 Messiah - Scenes From A Crucifixion (2000) - inspired by the New Testament.
 Ritual in Blood (2001) - originally written in 1965 under the titles of Hep, Hep, Hep and Blood Accusation. 
 The Secret Love Life of Ophelia (2001) - reworking of Shakespeare's Hamlet.
 Sit and Shiver (2004)
 Purgatory (2009)
 Biblical Tales  (2010) - consisting of four short plays adapted from stories from the Old Testament: Adam and Eve, Samson and Delilah, David and Goliath,Moses and Pharaoh  
 Oedipus (2011) - a version of Oedipus Rex by Sophocles.
 Six actors in Search of a Director (2012)
 Religion & Anarchy (2013) - consisting of five short plays about Jews and the holocaust:Guilt,Roast, Line-up,How to Train an Anti-Semite,Gas   
 An Actor's Lament (2013)
 Harvey - inspired by the Harvey Weinstein scandal and performed as a work-in-progress in 2019.Film West (1984) - TV movie written by Berkoff.
 Metamorphosis - TV adaptation for Theatre Night of Berkoff's play of the same name. Also feature's Berkoff playing the role of Mr. Samsa. 
 Silent Night (1991) - TV film starring Berkoff, based on his one-man-play Harry's Christmas. 
 7th November 1938 - short documentary film from the series The Day the World Changed. Presented by Berkoff talking about an important historical event of his choosing, which is Herschel Grynszpan's assassination of the German diplomat Ernst vom Rath.  
 Decadence (1994) - film written, directed by and starring Berkoff, based on his play of the same name.
 Eat Dollink! (2017) - documentary written by and starring Berkoff.
 Venice Beach (2017) - documentary directed, produced, written by and starring Berkoff.
 Shakespeare's Heroes and Villains (2019) - documentary written by and starring Berkoff, based on his one-man-play Shakespeare's Villains. 
 Steven Berkoff's Tell Tale Heart (2019) - film starring Berkoff and adapted by Stephen Cookson from Berkoff's one-man-play The Tell-Tale-Heart.  
 Brighton (2021) - film adapted by Stephen Cookson from Berkoff's play Brighton Beach Scumbags. Memoirs and essays Steven Berkoff's America (1988) - poetry and essays.
 I am Hamlet (1989) - based on Berkoff's working journal of his 1979 production of Shakespeare's Hamlet.
 A Prisoner in Rio (1989) - Berkoff's diary whilst filming the movie Prisoner of Rio.
 Coriolanus in Deutschland (1992) - Berkoff's journal of directing Shakespeare's Coriolanus in Munich.
 Overview (1994) - memories of Berkoff's travels around the world.
 Meditations on Metamorphosis (1995) - Berkoff's analysis of his various stage productions of Kafka's Metamorphosis.  
 Free Association (1996) - autobiography. 
 Shopping in the Santa Monica Mall (2000)
 Tough Acts (2003) - memoirs of working with various high-profile actors and directors.
 My Life in Food (2007) - Berkoff's memoirs about food.  
 Diary of a Juvenile Delinquent (2010) - autobiography. 
 Tales from an Actor's Life (2011) - autobiographical stories told in the third person.
 Richard II in New York (2008) - writing on Berkoff's experience of directing Shakespeare's Richard II in New York.
 A World Elsewhere (2019) - writings on Berkoff's work as an actor, director and playwright.Short stories Gross Intrusion and other stories (1979)
 Graft: Tales of an Actor (1998) - semi-autobiographical short stories. Published poetry Steven Berkoff's America (1988) - poetry and essays.
 Requiem for Ground Zero (2002) - inspired by the September 11 attacks.
 You Remind Me of Marilyn Monroe (2009)
 Poems for the Working Class (2021)Novel Sod the Bitches! (2015)Photography books The Theatre of Steven Berkoff (1992) - photographs of a variety of Berkoff's theatre productions, featuring written commentary by Berkoff.  
 East End Photographs (2012)
 Gorbals 1966 (2018) - photographs of the Gorbals area of Glasgow during Berkoff's time working at the Citizens Theatre

Awards and honours

Awards

Honours

The Berkoff Performing Arts Centre at Alton College, Hampshire, is named for Berkoff. Attending the Alton College ceremony to honour him, he stated:

He taught a drama master-class later that day, and performed Shakespeare's Villains for an invited audience that evening.

References

Sources
Billington, Michael. "Happy Birthday, Steven Berkoff". The Guardian Theatre Blog. 3 August 2007. ("The hard man with a sensitive soul is 70 today. I've always admired him as an actor, director and – above all – phenomenon.")
Cross, Robert. Steven Berkoff and the Theatre of Self-Performance. Manchester: Manchester University Press, 2004.  (10).  (13). (Rev. by Pankratz.) (Synopsis at Google Books, with hyperlinked table of contents and limited preview.)
Pankratz, Annette. Rev. of Steven Berkoff and the Theatre of Self-Performance. Modern Drama 48 (2005): 459–61. (Extract; Project Muse subscription required for online access to full text.)
Sierz, Aleks. In-Yer-Face Theatre: British Drama Today. London: Faber and Faber, 2001.  (10).  (13).
"Steven Berkoff". Contemporary Writers''. British Council. Retrieved 30 September 2008.

External links

 
 
 
 
 Steven Berkoff  at The Playwrights Database at Doolee.com
 Comprehensive Steven Berkoff website by Iain Fisher

1937 births
20th-century English male actors
20th-century English dramatists and playwrights
20th-century English male writers
21st-century English male actors
21st-century English writers
Alumni of the Webber Douglas Academy of Dramatic Art
Actor-managers
English comedy writers
English male film actors
English male stage actors
English male television actors
English male video game actors
English male voice actors
English people of Russian-Jewish descent
English people of Romanian-Jewish descent
Jewish English male actors
English satirists
English theatre directors
Living people
Male actors from London
People educated at Hackney Downs School
People educated at Raine's Foundation School
People from Stepney
Writers from London
English male dramatists and playwrights
L'École Internationale de Théâtre Jacques Lecoq alumni